The fourth season of Two and a Half Men originally aired  on CBS from September 18, 2006, to May 14, 2007.

Cast

Main
 Charlie Sheen as Charlie Harper
 Jon Cryer as Alan Harper
 Angus T. Jones as Jake Harper
 Marin Hinkle as Judith Harper-Melnick
 Conchata Ferrell as Berta
 April Bowlby as Kandi
 Holland Taylor as Evelyn Harper

Recurring
 Melanie Lynskey as Rose
 Ryan Stiles as Herb Melnick

Guest

 Steven Tyler as himself
 Katherine LaNasa as Lydia
 Sara Rue as Naomi
 Jane Lynch as Dr. Linda Freeman
 J.D. Walsh as Gordon
 Susan Sullivan as Dorothy
 Jessica Collins as Gloria
 Brooke Shields as Danielle Stewart
 Allison Janney as Beverly
 Brooke D'Orsay as Robin
 Morgan Fairchild as Donna
 Judy Greer as Myra Melnick
 Matt Roth as Greg
 Kay Panabaker as Sophia
 Joel Murray as Petey
 Andrea Savage as Lena
 Enrique Iglesias as Fernando
 Rachel Cannon as Chloe
 Robert Wagner as Teddy Leopold
 Mike Connors as Hugo

Episodes

US Nielsen ratings

References

General references 
 
 
 

Season 4
2006 American television seasons
2007 American television seasons